Out of Body may refer to:

 "Out of Body" (The Outer Limits), a television episode
 Out of Body (album), by the Hooters, 1993
 Out of Body, an album by Needtobreathe, 2020
 "Out of Body", a song by Gorillaz from Humanz, 2017

See also
 Out-of-body experience